6th Civil Affairs Group (6th CAG) was a United States Marine Corps Civil Affairs unit: organized, trained and equipped on Camp Lejeune, North Carolina from April to September 2005; conducted civil-military operations and civil affairs activities in al-Anbar from September 2005 to March 2006; and redeployed and deactivated in the United States from March to April 2006.

At the beginning of 2005, Marine Corps Commandant, General Michael W. Hagee, decided to  establish the 5th and 6th CAGs to provide operational and personnel relief to the Corp's two existing CAGs (3d CAG and 4th CAG), which had been continuously supporting Marine combat and stability operations in Iraq over the preceding three years.  The 6th CAG was activated on 1 June 2005, with Col. Paul W. Brier as the Commanding Officer and a cadre of officers and staff NCOs from the 4th Maintenance Battalion, to included its commander, LtCol Helen G. Pratt, as the 6th CAG's Executive Officer.

The 6th CAG deployed to Iraqi on 11 September and conducted a transfer of authority with the 5th Civil Affairs Group on 21 September.

Subsequently, the 6th CAG planned and provided civil affairs support for the command and ground combat elements of the 2nd Marine Division and Multi-National Force West in al-Anbar governate during 2005 and 2006. The Group supported operations including  Operation Sayeed, Operation Steel Curtain and Operation Liberty Express.  The unit was deactivated in April 2006 upon redeployment to the United States.

Mission 
6th CAG's mission:
"Plan and execute civil military operations in support the command and ground combat elements of the 2nd Marine Division and Multi-National Force West during Operation Iraqi Freedom, while serving as the liaison between military forces and civil authorities, the local population and non-governmental organizations. Conduct activities which enhance the relationship between the military and Iraqi personnel and organizations facilitated through application of civil affairs specialty skills in areas normally the responsibility of civil governments. Provide guidance in civil administration, economic development, heath, education, infrastructure restoration, and reconstruction."

Unit awards 
A unit citation or commendation is an award bestowed upon an organization for the action cited. Members of the unit who participated in said actions are allowed to wear on their uniforms the awarded unit citation. The 6th Civil Affairs Group has been presented with the following awards:

See also
 Civil affairs

Notes

References

Web

External links

Civil affairs groups of the United States Marine Corps